Marcos Siebert (born 16 March 1996 in Mar del Plata) is an Argentine racing driver. He was the Italian F4 champion for the 2016 season.

Career

Karting
Born in Mar del Plata, Siebert began karting in 2004 at the age of eight, his highlights of his karting career being a second and third at the 2005 and 2006 editions of the Promocional karting events.

Lower Formulae
Siebert graduated to single-seaters in 2011, spending two seasons in Formula Metropolitan, finishing 12th in the 2012 season. The following year, Siebert moved to the Formula Renault 2.0 series with Jenzer Motorsport, finishing 24th in both that year's editions of the Eurocup and Alps series.

Italian F4 Championship
After a year out of motorsport, Siebert reunited with Jenzer in 2015 to partake in the Italian F4 Championship. In his first season, he claimed two victories and finished fifth in the standings. He remained with Jenzer for the 2016 season and claimed the championship ahead of Mick Schumacher.

GP3 Series
In 2015, Siebert joined Jenzer for the post-season test at Yas Marina and to act as their reserve driver for 2016. In November 2016, Siebert once again took part in post-season testing with Jenzer and Trident Racing. In March 2017, Siebert joined Campos Racing for the pre-season test at Estoril.

Racing record

Career summary

† As Siebert was a guest driver, he was ineligible for points.

Complete Italian F4 Championship results 
(key) (Races in bold indicate pole position) (Races in italics indicate fastest lap)

Complete GP3 Series results
(key) (Races in bold indicate pole position) (Races in italics indicate fastest lap)

Complete Euroformula Open Championship results 
(key) (Races in bold indicate pole position; races in italics indicate points for the fastest lap of top ten finishers)

Complete European Le Mans Series results
(key) (Races in bold indicate pole position; results in italics indicate fastest lap)

Complete Asian Le Mans Series results 
(key) (Races in bold indicate pole position) (Races in italics indicate fastest lap)

References

External links
 
 

1996 births
Living people
Sportspeople from Mar del Plata
Italian F4 Championship drivers
Italian F4 champions
Argentine GP3 Series drivers
Euroformula Open Championship drivers
Formula Regional European Championship drivers

Formula Renault 2.0 NEC drivers
Formula Renault Eurocup drivers
European Le Mans Series drivers
Jenzer Motorsport drivers
Campos Racing drivers
US Racing drivers
EuroInternational drivers
Asian Le Mans Series drivers
GT4 European Series drivers